Helsinki Roosters is an American football team based in Helsinki, Finland. The team plays in the Vaahteraliiga in Finland and their home field is the Helsinki Velodrome.

History 

Roosters were founded in 1979 and the club is a founding member of the American Football Association of Finland (SAJL). The team has played in every season of the Vaahteraliiga and has only been left out of the playoffs twice. The Roosters have won the regular season 11 times and have gone the whole season unbeaten for five times (in 1983, 1988, 1999, 2002 and 2013). The Roosters have friendly rivalry with local Helsinki Wolverines and Helsinki 69ers.

Roosters have also been successful in international competitions. In 1988 they won the Eurobowl II in London, where the Roosters beat Amsterdam Crusaders 35–14. In 1989 Roosters came third-placed. In 1994, Roosters took part in the Football League of Europe. Roosters participated in the European Club Championship tournament in 1996, 1997, 1998 and 1999. Roosters tour yearly to play international friendlies and were the first Finnish team ever to play in United States in 1985.

Roosters won the first IFAF Europe Champions League in 2014. They beat Vukovi Beograd 36–29 in the final, held in Elancourt, France.

Honours

Men 
 Vaahteraliiga championship titles: 22
 1982, 1983, 1986–1988, 1990, 1995–2000, 2002, 2004, 2012–2019
 Eurobowl titles: 1
1988
 IFAF Champions League titles: 1
2014

Women 
 Finnish championship titles: 1
 2011

Notable players 
  Micah Brown
  Robert Johnson
  Sonté Wong (WR)
  Tuomas Kivisaari
  Iiro Luoto
  Roope Noronen
  Petrus Penkki
  Michael Quarshie
  Josh Hollingsworth
  Matias Sarvela
  Brad Tayles
  Mike Kane  Running back for Roosters- 1988 Eurobowl Champions
  Tim Johnson (American football coach) Import player in mid to late 1980's

Club structure 
The Roosters men's first team plays in Vaahteraliiga, the top American football league in Finland. Roosters also have 5 boys' youth teams: U20, U17, U15, U13 and U9.

Rooster Ladies, the women's first team plays in Finnish championship series, the highest tier of American football for women in Finland. The women's team played semi-contact football before, but from 2008 onwards they have played 9-vs-9 full contact football. Roosters have one girls' youth team: U20.

See also
 East City Giants
 Helsinki 69ers
 Helsinki Wolverines

References

External links 
 Official Website 
 Helsinki Roosters on Facebook
 Helsinki Roosters on Twitter
 Vaahteraliiga  
 Women's Finnish Championship Series 

American football teams in Finland
Sports clubs in Helsinki
1979 establishments in Finland
American football teams established in 1979